The national Indian governing body of archery as a sport in India is the Archery Association of India.

Deepika Kumari is the first Indian archer to achieve World Number 1 rank in Women's Individual Recurve. She achieved this feat on 14 June in 2012. She again achieved the feat by reaching #1 rank on 28 June 2021. She has won an individual gold medal in archery at the 2010 Commonwealth Games, beating Olympic bronze medalist Alison Williamson.  She has also won 5 medals in World Cup Finals which include 4 individual silver medal. She has also won 2 silver medals in World Archery Championships as part of the women's recurve team.

Dola Banerjee became first Indian world champion in archery by winning the gold medal in the women's individual recurve competition at the Archery World Cup Final held at Dubai in November 2007. Dola Banerjee is the second woman archer to be honored with the Arjuna award by the Government of India in 2005. In Commonwealth Games 2010 in New Delhi, she won gold medal in Women's Team Recurve with Deepika Kumari.

Rajat Chauhan is the first Indian archer to win a silver medal in Men's Individual Compound event in World Archery Championships. He achieved this feat at 2015 World Archery Championships.

Jyothi Surekha Vennam is the first India female archer to win an individual medal in Women's Individual Compound event in World Archery Championships. She wone a bronze medal at 2019 World Archery Championships.

Rahul Banerjee won a gold medal at the 2010 Commonwealth Games in Delhi, in the individual recurve event and a team bronze medal. Banerjee received the Arjuna Award in 2011.

Another notable Indian archer is three-time Olympian Limba Ram. Ram met a world record in 1992 at the Asian Archery Championships held that year in Beijing.

Current Rankings

Recurve

Men's individual recurve 
Rankings at 15 August 2021

|

Women's individual recurve 
Rankings at 4 August 2021

|-
|

Notable Performances

Total medals won by Indian Archers in Major tournaments

Notable Performance at Summer Olympics

See also
 Archery Association of India
 Deepika Kumari
 Dola Banerjee
 Jyothi Surekha Vennam
 Bombayla Devi Laishram
 Rajat Chauhan
 Abhishek Verma
 Tarundeep Rai
 Jayanta Talukdar
 Atanu Das
 Rahul Banerjee
 Limba Ram
 Sanjeeva Kumar Singh
 Indian Archers

References

External links
 Website of Archery Association of India